Lucas de Oliveira Cunha, generally known as Lucas Cunha or Luquinhas, (born 30 July 1997) is a Brazilian footballer who plays as a midfielder for Comercial-SP.

Career
At the age of 17, Cunha played for Friburguense in the 2015 Campeonato Carioca, appearing in seven matches in the Taça Guanabara. After appearing in Friburguense's 2016 Copa Rio victory, he left the club in early 2017 after being unable to agree on a new contract.

Cunha made his debut for Mogi Mirim against Botafogo (São Paulo) in the 2017 Campeonato Brasileiro Série C. He played one more match in the Série C before leaving the club.

In late 2018, Cunha joined Primavera for the 2019 Campeonato Paulista Série A3 season, where he played eight matches.

References

External links

Living people
1997 births
Brazilian footballers
Sportspeople from Minas Gerais
Association football midfielders
Friburguense Atlético Clube players
Mogi Mirim Esporte Clube players
Sociedade Esportiva Matonense players
FC Balkany Zorya players
Campeonato Brasileiro Série C players
Uzbekistan Super League players
Brazilian expatriate footballers
Expatriate footballers in Uzbekistan
Brazilian expatriate sportspeople in Uzbekistan
Expatriate footballers in Ukraine
Brazilian expatriate sportspeople in Ukraine